Off the Bar is a British television comedy/sports talk on the Loaded TV network.

The show
Off the bar is a British football talk show, set in a British style pub, on Loaded TV (Sky channel 200). It is hosted by Matt Lorenzo, with Tony Gale, Alan Bentley and Ann Marie Davies and other celebrity guests. Airs on a Friday nights at 9pm.

Sources
Sky TV
World News
Eerie Investigations
Liverpool Echo
Features Exec

British comedy television shows
Loaded TV original programming